Major-General Richard Hugh Barry,  (9 November 1908 – 30 April 1999) was a British Army officer and a member of the Special Operations Executive during the Second World War.

Biography 
Barry was born in London, the only son and elder child of Army officer Lieutenant-Colonel Alfred Percival Barry and Helen Charlotte, née Stephens. His paternal great-grandfather was the architect Sir Charles Barry. He was educated at Winchester College, where he was a commoner, and Royal Military College, Sandhurst. He was commissioned into the Somerset Light Infantry, his father's regiment, in 1929.

He joined the Special Operations Executive in 1941, first as the head of the operations department. Attached to the planning staff of Dwight D. Eisenhower in November 1942, he was recalled to the SOE in 1943 as Colin Gubbins's chief of staff.

After the war, Barry was posted to Stockholm as military attaché in 1946, before becoming Deputy Chief of Staff,Western Europe Land Forces in 1948.

References 

1908 births
1999 deaths
Somerset Light Infantry officers
British Army personnel of World War II
British Special Operations Executive personnel
People educated at Winchester College
Graduates of the Royal Military College, Sandhurst
Companions of the Order of the Bath
Commanders of the Order of the British Empire
Intelligence Corps officers
British Army major generals
20th-century British translators